Rock Grove Township is one of twelve townships in Floyd County, Iowa, USA.  As of the 2000 census, its population was 1,849.

Geography
According to the United States Census Bureau, Rock Grove Township covers an area of 39.92 square miles (103.39 square kilometers); of this, 39.89 square miles (103.32 square kilometers, 99.93 percent) is land and 0.03 square miles (0.07 square kilometers, 0.07 percent) is water.

Cities, towns, villages
 Nora Springs (vast majority)

Unincorporated towns
 Nora Junction at 
(This list is based on USGS data and may include former settlements.)

Adjacent townships
 Cedar Township, Mitchell County (northeast)
 Rudd Township (east)
 Rockford Township (south)
 Portland Township, Cerro Gordo County (west)
 Falls Township, Cerro Gordo County (northwest)

Cemeteries
The township contains these three cemeteries: Park, Rock Grove Township and Spring Grove.

Major highways
  U.S. Route 18

Rivers
 Shell Rock River

School districts
 Nora Springs-Rock Falls Community School District
 Rudd-Rockford-Marble Rk Community School District

Political districts
 Iowa's 4th congressional district
 State House District 14
 State Senate District 7

References
 United States Census Bureau 2008 TIGER/Line Shapefiles
 United States Board on Geographic Names (GNIS)
 United States National Atlas

External links
 US-Counties.com
 City-Data.com

Townships in Floyd County, Iowa
Townships in Iowa